Sir Alan McLean (5 July 1875 – 9 May 1959) was a British Member of Parliament.

McLean was educated at Harrow School and Trinity College, Cambridge.  He became a barrister at Lincoln's Inn.  He was also chair of the Lamson Paragon Supply Company, and served on the council of the National Rifle Association.  During World War I, he served in France.

McLean stood for the Conservative Party in Caerphilly at the 1922 United Kingdom general election, but was not elected.  He then stood in South West Norfolk in 1923, winning the seat.  He held the seat until 1929, when he was defeated, but won the seat back at the 1931 United Kingdom general election, standing down in 1935.

McLean retired to Alford, Aberdeenshire, where he was elected to Aberdeenshire County Council, serving as its convenor from 1950 until 1955.  He was also a deputy lieutenant for Aberdeenshire.

McLean was knighted in 1933, and was also made a Member of the Order of the British Empire.

References

1875 births
1959 deaths
People educated at Harrow School
Alumni of Trinity College, Cambridge
Members of Lincoln's Inn
Conservative Party (UK) MPs for English constituencies
Councillors in Aberdeenshire
UK MPs 1923–1924
UK MPs 1924–1929
UK MPs 1931–1935